Moskovo (Mäskäw) is a rural locality (a selo) and the administrative centre of Moskovsky Selsoviet, Dyurtyulinsky District, Bashkortostan, Russia. The population was 1,879 as of 2010. There are 21 streets.

Geography 
Nazitamak is located 27 km southeast of Dyurtyuli (the district's administrative centre) by road. Imay-Utarovo is the nearest rural locality.

References 

Rural localities in Dyurtyulinsky District